Lega Sardegna (abbr.

LNS) in 2010, but, despite being loosely affiliated with Lega Nord (LS) through Roberto Mura (a Lombard senator of Sardinian descent), it was never recognised among the LN's "national" sections. At its beginnings, LNS's main local leader was Giorgio Ladu, a former national secretary of the social-democratic Sardinian Action Party (PSd'Az). The party became the regional section of Lega per Salvini Premier (LSP) in Sardinia in 2020.

In the 2009 European Parliament election LN won 0.7% in the region. The party was strongest in the province of Ogliastra (5.1%), Ladu's political base, and in the province of Olbia-Tempio (1.9%). In the 2010 provincial elections the party won 2.9% in Ogliastra (where Ladu won 3.0% as candidate for President), 1.5% in Olbia-Tempio, 0.8% in Sassari and 0.4% in Cagliari.

In the 2014 European Parliament election LN won 1.4% in the region, doing better in the Province of Olbia-Tempio (2.4%) than anywhere else.

In the 2018 general election candidates of the PSd'Az ran within the "Lega - Salvini Premier" list, as the LN and the PSd'Az had formed an alliance. The alliance managed to get 10.8% of the vote and Christian Solinas, leader of the PSd'Az, was elected to the Senate, while Guido De Martini, a local activist of the LN, was elected to the Chamber.

In the 2019 regional election the League successfully supported Solinas for President. Solinas won 47.8% of the vote. The League was the leading force of the local centre-right coalition, gaining 11.4% and 8 seats (out of 60) in the regional council.

In 2020 the LS became the regional section of Lega per Salvini Premier and since 2021 it has been led by Dario Giagoni.

Popular support

The electoral results of Lega Nord Sardinia in the region are shown in the table below.

References

External links
Official website
 Lega Nord Sassari

Political parties in Sardinia
Political parties established in 2010
Lega Nord